Stanley Franks (born July 7, 1986, in Long Beach, California) is a former defensive back in the Canadian Football League. Franks signed as a free agent to the Lions practice roster on October 27, 2009. Prior to the 2010 season, Franks won the job as starting defensive halfback. Prior to his time with the Lions, he played for the af2 champion Spokane Shock. He also played college football for the Idaho Vandals. At the Vandals was when he moved positions from playing wide receiver to defensive back and in 2006 was the NCAA interception leader.

References

External links
BC Lions profile page

1986 births
Living people
African-American players of Canadian football
American players of Canadian football
BC Lions players
Canadian football defensive backs
Players of Canadian football from Long Beach, California
Spokane Shock players
21st-century African-American sportspeople
20th-century African-American people